Miss World France is a title that has been officially and unofficially conferred upon French representatives to Miss World since 1951.

Titleholders 

France
Beauty pageants in France